Elman may refer to:

 El Maan, a town in south-central Somalia
 Elman FC, a Somali football club
 Elman (name)

See also
 Ellman, a surname